Aller Hill is an 18.4 hectare (45.4 acre) biological Site of Special Scientific Interest near Aller in Somerset, notified in 1988.

The site contains three species of plant which are nationally rare and a further three which are of restricted distribution in Somerset. The central area contains a sward dominated by sheep's fescue (Festuca ovina) in combination with yellow oat grass (Trisetum flavescens) and quaking-grass (Briza media). Salad burnet (Sanguisorba minor) forms a major component of the sward with rough marsh-mallow (Althaea hirsuta) and nit-grass (Gastridium ventricosum), two
nationally rare species, also present.

Aller and Beer Woods on the slopes of the hill are also designated as a biological Site of Special Scientific Interest.

References 

Sites of Special Scientific Interest in Somerset
Hills of Somerset
Sites of Special Scientific Interest notified in 1988
Somerset Levels